Qalat (also Romanized as Qalāt; also known as Kalāt) is a village in Derak Rural District, in the Central District of Shiraz County, Fars Province, Iran. At the 2006 census, its population was 2,613, in 697 families.

There is a church called the Glory of Christ in the village. This building has survived from the Qajar period and is surrounded by charming gardens.

References 

Populated places in Shiraz County